The Vigyan Gaurav Award or the Vigyan Gaurav Samman is a lifetime achievement award for scientific research conferred by the Council of Science and Technology, Government of Uttar Pradesh in India. The council also presents a Vigyan Ratna Award. This is the highest science related award given by Uttar Pradesh government.

Recipients
 2000 - Ved Prakash Kamboj
 2001 - 2002 - Prem Chand Pandey
 2002-03 - Dr. Lalji Singh - Vice-Chancellor of Banaras Hindu University
 2003-04 - Dr. J. S. Yadav - director of Indian Institute of Chemical Technology (IICT), Hyderabad
 2003-04 - Dr. R. P. Bajpai - director of Central Scientific Instruments Organisation (CSIO), Chandigarh
2005-06 - Professor Javed Iqbal- Director, Institute of Life Sciences, University of Hyderabad Campus, Gachibowli, Hyderabad
 2008-09 - Prof. Anil Kumar Tyagi - head of biochemistry department, Delhi University
 2008-09 - Prof. Kabiruddin - chemistry department, Aligarh Muslim University
 2010-11 - Prof. R. K. Sharma - director of Sanjay Gandhi Post Graduate Institute of Medical Sciences 
 2010-11 - Prof. Sunil Pradhan - neurologist at Sanjay Gandhi Post Graduate Institute of Medical Sciences
 2010-11 - Prof. Mohammad Iqbal - professor of Botany from Jamia Hamdard University 
 2010-11 - Chandra Shekhar Nautiyal - director of National Botanical Research Institute
2015-16 - Prof. Nirmal Kumar Gupta - Head of Cardio Vascular Thoracic Surgery, Sanjay Gandhi Post Graduate Institute of Medical Sciences, Lucknow

See also 

 List of general science and technology awards

References

9. https://web.archive.org/web/20160304060800/http://insaindia.org/detail.php?id=P01-1295

External links
 

Indian science and technology awards
Science and technology in Uttar Pradesh
Year of establishment missing